The Belgian Hockey League, also known as the Belgian Elite League, was the highest level of competition organized by the Royal Belgian Ice Hockey Federation. The league winner was crowned the Belgian Champion. The league had been in existence since 1912. The Brussels Royal IHSC were the most decorated team with 23 titles. In 2015, the league merged with the Dutch Eredivisie to form the BeNe League.

History

Early history 
The Belgian Hockey League played first in 1912. The play was interrupted several times in its history. The next break was from 1929-1934 due to the world economic crisis. The 3rd and last break was in the 1994/95 season, which was cancelled after the regular season due to issues over playoff participation.

Recent history 
In 2009, there were 5 clubs competing in the Elite league for the Belgian Championship.

During the 2010–2011 season, the two top Belgian teams competed in a joint tournament with the teams of the Dutch  Eredivisie called the North Sea Cup.  The other three teams dropped out of the Belgian elite league to join the Belgian National League, leaving only Herentals and Turnhout to decide the Belgian Championship.  Leuven Chiefs played in the North Sea Cup for the 2011–2012 season, but Turnhout dropped out of the league midway through the season and Leuven dropped out at the end of the season.

In 2012, the North Sea Cup was discontinued and HYC Herentals joined the Dutch Eredivisie.  For the 2012–2013 season, the teams of the Belgian National League joined Leuven and Turnhout to form the Belgian Elite League, the winner of which becomes the Belgian national champion.

As of 2012–2013, the teams of the Belgian Elite League, plus HYC Herentals, compete for the Belgian Cup, which is played before and during the Elite League season.

Teams

Belgian Hockey League Champions

Total titles won

References

External links
Belgian Ice Hockey Federation

 
Defunct ice hockey leagues in Europe
1
Sports leagues established in 1912
1912 establishments in Belgium
Professional sports leagues in Belgium